East Midlands Today is the BBC's regional television news programme for the East Midlands.

The programme is broadcast on BBC One from studios at the BBC's East Midlands broadcasting centre in Nottingham, also home to Radio Nottingham. The main transmitter for the programme is Waltham near Melton Mowbray in Leicestershire.

The programme can be watched in any part of the UK (and Europe) from Astra 1N on Freesat channel 952 and Sky channel 960. The latest edition of BBC East Midlands Today is also available to watch on the BBC iPlayer.

History
BBC East Midlands Today was established as an independent programme on 7 January 1991, having previously been a part of Midlands Today, which now solely covers the West Midlands region.

The split arose from criticisms of Midlands Today as being too centric on West Midlands coverage, although a service of separate opt-out bulletins for the region had been provided during the 1980s.

On 5 February 1996, the show introduced a double-anchored presentation with Quentin Rayner and Kathy Rochford. The programme's newer (generic) 'look', in line with most other BBC regional TV news programmes, was introduced on 16 September 2002, with an update on 6 September 2004. The current titles and graphics were introduced in July 2019.

Coverage area
Parts of the Government-defined East Midlands region may also receive BBC Look North (from Leeds or Hull), Look East, South Today or even, towards the Buxton area of Derbyshire, North West Tonight.

All of Northamptonshire can receive East Midlands Today, but most of this area is covered by Look East and South Today. Some parts of south and west Leicestershire receive Midlands Today, which covers the West Midlands.

In most of Lincolnshire, BBC regional news is supplied by Look North East Yorkshire and Lincolnshire, broadcast from Hull. East Midlands Today still covers South Kesteven.

On air
 Short news bulletins every half-hour during BBC Breakfast
 A 15-minute lunchtime bulletin airs at 1:30pm, following the BBC News at One
 A 30-minute main edition of East Midlands Today is broadcast every weeknight between 6.30pm and 7.00pm
 A 5-minute late night bulletin, separately branded as East Midlands Tonight from 18 March 2019 to 22 January 2021, airs at 10.25pm on weekdays, following the BBC News at Ten
 A 5-minute bulletin on Saturday early evening
 A 5-minute bulletin on Sunday early evening
 A 5-minute bulletin is also broadcast on Sunday nights, following the BBC News at Ten

Presenters

News
Anne Davies (Lead Anchor) – Lunchtime Bulletin, Tuesday/Wednesday & Main Programme, Monday-Thursday

Weather

Sara Blizzard
Rich Davis
 Kaye Forster
 Anna Church
 Gillian Brown (Relief)
Alexandra Hamilton 
Oly Woodcock (Relief)

Former on air team
 Dominic Heale (ex-main presenter, 2001–2020)
 Lukwesa Burak (now with the BBC News channel & BBC World News)
 Jo Wheeler (freelance with Sky News)
 Des Coleman (now with ITV News Central)
 Martine Croxall (now with the BBC News channel & BBC World News)
 Shulie Ghosh (now with Al Jazeera English in Doha)
 Kylie Pentelow (now with ITV News)
 Priya-Kaur Jones (now with France 24)
 John Hess (Political correspondent until retiring in 2015, briefly returned for coverage on the EU Referendum in 2016)
 Maurice Flynn (ex-weekend presenter 2009–2019)
 Ivan Gaskell (now with BBC Sport)
 Sarah Stirk (now with Sky Sports)
 Nina Warhurst (now a business presenter on BBC Breakfast)

References

 https://www.rxtvlog.com/2020/03/bbc-streamlines-news-programmes-as.html

External links 
 

1991 British television series debuts
2000s British television series
2010s British television series
2020s British television series
BBC Regional News shows
Television news in England